Al Fasyimi (born 21 July 1998) is an Indonesian professional footballer who plays as a midfielder.

Club career

Persiraja Banda Aceh
He was signed for Persiraja Banda Aceh to play in Liga 1 in the 2021 season. Fasyimi made his first-team debut on 23 October 2021 as a substitute in a match against Arema at the Maguwoharjo Stadium, Sleman.

Career statistics

Club

Notes

References

External links
 Al Fasyimi at Soccerway
 Al Fasyimi at Liga Indonesia

1998 births
Living people
Indonesian footballers
Persiraja Banda Aceh players
Association football midfielders
People from Bireuën Regency
Sportspeople from Aceh